Come A Come is the debut studio album of the Korean girl group Chakra. The singles in this album were Come A Come, Sign Of Love, and Hey You. The album sold about 150,000 that led them to win many rookie awards in South Korea.

Track listing 

 The New voxby
 Han (한)
 Sarangjinghu (사랑징후)
 Why (feat. Danny Ohm)
 Makea Love
 Fantasy (feat. X-Large)
 Champion
 Gyeolsim (결심)
 Hey U (feat. Danny Ohm)
 Ibyeoljinghu (이별징후)
 Giwon (Duet By Ryeo Won And Danny Ohm) (기원)

2000 debut albums
Chakra (group) albums